The Men's high jump event  at the 2007 European Athletics Indoor Championships was held on March 3–4.

Medalists

Results

Qualification
Qualification: Qualification Performance 2.30 (Q) or at least 8 best performers advanced to the final.

Final

References
Results

High jump at the European Athletics Indoor Championships
High